Peter Albert Charles Senior (born 31 July 1959) is an Australian professional golfer who has won more than twenty tournaments around the world.

Senior has competed mainly on the PGA Tour of Australasia, where he has had the most success and won the Order of Merit on four occasions, and the European Tour. He has also played occasionally on the Japan Golf Tour and the United States-based PGA Tour.

Senior has represented Australia in international competitions several times, and was a member of the International Team at the first two stagings of the Presidents Cup. He has also represented Australia twice at the World Cup.

Personal life
Senior was born in Singapore. He lives in Hope Island, Queensland with his wife June, whom he married in 1984. They have three children: Krystlle, Jasmine and Mitchell.

In his spare time Peter enjoys fishing, reading and spending time with his family.  Peter also owns various other businesses unrelated to his golfing career.

Professional career
Senior turned professional in 1978 and joined the PGA Tour of Australia, now the PGA Tour of Australasia. During his career, he has won 21 tournaments on the tour, including the Australian PGA Championship in 1989, 2003 and 2010, the Australian Open in 1989 and 2012, and the Australian Masters in 1991, 1995 and 2015. Senior has won professional events on the main men's tour in five separate decades, a feat achieved by very few players previously anywhere in the world. He also has the distinction of winning the Australian PGA, Open and Masters tournaments after he turned 50. He also topped the tour's Order of Merit in 1987, 1989 and 1993. Even after reaching the age of fifty, he remained competitive on the tour, through until his retirement from golf in 2016.

Between 1984 and 1992, Senior competed on the European Tour full-time, winning four tournaments and finishing a career best of 7th on the Order of Merit in 1987. He also played regularly on the Japanese Tour, winning three tournaments before rejoining the European Tour in 1998. Through the 2007 season he continued to play in a small number of tournaments on the tour.

In 1985, Senior finished 5th at the PGA Tour Qualifying Tournament to earn his card for the following season. He did not have much success, making just two cuts in the first half of the season, before he elected to return to Europe. He did play in several PGA Tour events in other seasons, notably finishing tied for second in The International in 1990, but never tried to qualify for the tour again.

Senior made his debut on the over-50 circuit the Champions Tour in February 2010 at The ACE Group Classic. Senior has yet to win on the Champions Tour, but has finished as a runner up on six occasions, with three playoff defeats. One of these came in February 2012 at the Allianz Championship, when Senior birdied the final hole of regulation to make the playoff before losing to Corey Pavin with a birdie on the first playoff hole.

Senior announced his retirement during the second round of the 2016 Australian Open held at The Royal Sydney Golf Club. Senior suffered a hip injury on the sixth hole and announced his retirement from professional golf shortly after.

Professional wins (35)

European Tour wins (4)

European Tour playoff record (1–0)

Japan Golf Tour wins (3)

1Co-sanctioned by the Asia Golf Circuit

PGA Tour of Australasia wins (21)

1Co-sanctioned by the OneAsia Tour

PGA Tour of Australasia playoff record (5–1)

Von Nida Tour wins (1)

Other wins (3)
1985 Western Australia PGA Championship
1987 Victorian PGA Championship (Non-tour event)
1995 Australian Skins Game

European Senior Tour wins (1)

PGA of Australia Legends Tour wins (2)

Playoff record
Champions Tour playoff record (0–3)

Results in major championships

CUT = missed the half-way cut (3rd round cut in 1979 Open Championship)
"T" = tied

Summary

Most consecutive cuts made – 8 (1992 Open Championship – 1995 PGA)
Longest streak of top-10s – 1 (twice)

Results in The Players Championship

CUT = missed the halfway cut

Results in World Golf Championships

1Cancelled due to 9/11

"T" = Tied
NT = No tournament
Note that the HSBC Champions did not become a WGC event until 2009.

Team appearances
Amateur
Australian Men's Interstate Teams Matches (representing Queensland): 1976, 1977, 1978

Professional
Dunhill Cup (representing Australia): 1987, 1993
Four Tours World Championship (representing Australasia): 1987, 1988, 1989, 1990 (winners)
World Cup (representing Australia): 1988, 1990
Presidents Cup (International Team): 1994, 1996
UBS Cup (representing the Rest of the World): 2004

See also
1985 PGA Tour Qualifying School graduates

Notes

References

External links

Peter Senior player profile, Golf Australia

Australian male golfers
PGA Tour of Australasia golfers
European Tour golfers
Japan Golf Tour golfers
PGA Tour golfers
European Senior Tour golfers
PGA Tour Champions golfers
Australian people of Singaporean descent
People from Singapore
Sportspeople from the Gold Coast, Queensland
1959 births
Living people